Lieutenant General Aubrey Phegelelo Sedibe  MBChB is a South African military commander.  A medical doctor, he served in Umkhonto weSizwe (MK), the military wing of the African National Congress, during the liberation struggle against the South African government in the 1980s, and transferred to the South African National Defence Force when MK was incorporated into it in 1994.

Early life 
He was born in Alexandra Township in 1957.

Military career 
After the uprising of 1976, he was forced to join the MK in exile. He completed his military training from 1977 to 1979 in Mozambique, Angola and the Soviet Union.

He was sent to Germany for medical studies, completing his Bachelor in Medicine (MBChB) and internship in 1993. He returned  to South Africa in 1994 to join the South African Military Health Service (SAMHS).

Before taking over as Surgeon General on 1 April 2013 he was the Chief Director Military Health Force Preparation

Awards and decorations

See also
List of South African military chiefs
South African Medical Service

References

1957 births
Living people
UMkhonto we Sizwe personnel
South African generals
South African military doctors